Lewis' Battery was an artillery battery in the British Overseas Territory of Gibraltar.

Description
During World War II Lewis Battery was the site of two 6 inch guns on the Rock of Gibraltar. These guns could fire over 6,000 yards.

References

Batteries in Gibraltar